Cardamine lilacina, commonly known as the lilac bitter-cress, is a herbaceous plant native to Australia.

References

lilacina
Flora of New South Wales